Daniel Darko Janacković (born 11 May 1967), commonly known as Darko Janacković, is a Serbian-born French football manager and a former footballer.

Playing career
Born and raised in Pirot, Yugoslavia, he began his footballing career in 1978 with Belgrade-based FK Partizan. In 1980, he moved to France and more accurately to Dieppe where he began playing for FC Dieppe.

Yugoslavia
He began his professional footballing career in the year 1986 with Yugoslav Premier League and his hometown based side FK Radnički Pirot. In 1987, he moved to Belgrade where he signed a one-year contract with another Yugoslav Premier League side OFK Beograd.

Portugal
He first moved out of Yugoslavia in 1988 to Portugal where he signed a two-year contract with Segunda Liga side Moreirense F.C. In 1990, he moved to the city of Aveiro where he had a two-year stint with Primeira Liga side S.C. Beira-Mar, thus ending his professional footballing career as the Serbian met with a car accident later.

Managerial career
Darko holds the UEFA A Licence, the second highest football coaching qualification. He received the UEFA A Licence in 2009 from the Football Association of Serbia.

Yugoslavia
He began his managerial career in 2000 with the U-19 team of his former club, FK Partizan where he worked as an assistant to Serbian football manager, Zvonko Živković, helping his side clinch the trophy of the U-19 championship of Yugoslavia.

In 2001, he moved to Belgrade where he was appointed as the head coach of the U-18 team of his former club, OFK Beograd. He helped his side secure third position in the 2001–02 U-18 championship of Yugoslavia.

Later in 2002, he moved back to his hometown, Pirot, where he was appointed as the head coach of his former club and Yugoslav Second League side, FK Radnički Pirot. He helped his club qualify for the Quarter-finals stage of the Yugoslav Cup in 2002.

France
He first moved out of Yugoslavia as a football manager in 2004 to France and more accurately to Avion where he was appointed as the head coach of Championnat de France Amateur side, CS Avion.

Serbia
In 2006, he moved to Serbia where he signed a one-year contract to be appointed as the head coach of Meridian Prva Liga (now known as Serbian SuperLiga) side, FK Hajduk Kula.

Back to France
He moved back to France in 2007 and began working as a scout for Ligue 1 side, FC Metz.

Algeria
In 2008, he again moved out of Serbia and this time to North Africa and more accurately to Algeria where he was appointed as the head coach of Algerian club ES Sétif.

Later in 2008, he moved to Constantine where he was appointed as the head coach of Algeria's oldest football club, CS Constantine.

In January 2009, he began coaching another Constantine-based side, MO Constantine and helped them secure the 5th position in the championship.

He was also awarded the Best Manager of the Season award at the end of the 2008–09 season.

Indonesia
In 2010, he again moved out of Serbia and this time to Indonesia where he was appointed as the head coach of Indonesia Super League side, Persib Bandung on a one-year deal which was believed to be the most expensive deal of the season in Indonesia football.

Bahrain
He moved to the Middle East and more accurately to Bahrain in July 2011, where he was appointed as the head coach of Bahraini Premier League side, East Riffa Club he finished his contrat in June 2012.

Back to Indonesia
In July 2012, he moved back to Indonesia where he was appointed as the Technical director-and-manager of Indonesia Super League side, Persipasi Bandung Raya.

Back to Algeria
In 2014-2015, he moved back to Algeria and more accurately to Larbaâ where he began coaching Algerian Ligue Professionnelle 1 side, RC Arbaâ.

Oman
In January 2016, he again made a move to the Middle East and this time to Oman where on 23 January, he was appointed as the head coach of Sohar-based Oman Professional League side, Sohar SC for the remaining of the 2015–16 Oman Professional League season. In his  successful start at the Sohar-based side, he helped them finish at the fourth position in the 2015–16 season and also helped them secure the runners-up position in the 2015–16 Oman Professional League Cup, which are the club's best ever performances in both the competitions, respectively. He finished his contrat in June 2018 with a big satisfaction of a succès and satisfaction of his work during two years and half in Oman.

Coaching courses
He has had the opportunity of participating in various coaching courses under top European managers like Arsène Wenger at Arsenal F.C. in August 2002, Raynald Denoueix at Real Sociedad in January 2003 and Vicente del Bosque at Real Madrid C.F. in February 2003.

Achievements as manager

Honors
Partizan U-19 (Assistant manager)
 Yugoslav Championship U-19''': 2000–01.
 Graduated Football Coach First Level,
 Best in the Promotion in 2002.
 10 UEFA Cups games in 2006-2007.
 Best success in the history ever of the Hajduk fc.
 Winner of the Arabic Cup 2008 Entente de Setif.
 Best Coach in Algeria 2008-2009.
 First in the half saison 2008-2009.
 The most expensive Coach in the History of Indonesian Football 2010.
 Best Coach in Bahreïn 2011-2012.
 Final Cup in Algeria 2014-2015
 Sohar fc Oman Professional League Cup runners-up 2015-16
 Best Coach in Oman 2016.

References

External links
Darko Janacković - GOAL

Darko Janacković - EUROSPORT
Darko Janacković - SOCCER PUNTER

1967 births
Living people
People from Pirot
Association football midfielders
Serbian footballers
FK Radnički Pirot players
OFK Beograd players
Moreirense F.C. players
S.C. Beira-Mar players
Expatriate footballers in Portugal
Yugoslav footballers
Yugoslav expatriate footballers
Yugoslav expatriate sportspeople in Portugal
Yugoslav emigrants to France
French expatriate sportspeople in Portugal
French expatriate footballers
Serbia and Montenegro football managers
Serbian football managers
French football managers
Persib Bandung managers
Pelita Bandung Raya managers
RC Arbaâ managers
Sohar SC managers
AS Aïn M'lila managers
Expatriate football managers in Algeria
Serbian expatriate sportspeople in Algeria
French expatriate sportspeople in Algeria
Expatriate football managers in Indonesia
Serbian expatriate sportspeople in Indonesia
French expatriate sportspeople in Indonesia
Expatriate football managers in Bahrain
Serbian expatriate sportspeople in Bahrain
French expatriate sportspeople in Bahrain
Expatriate football managers in Oman
Serbian expatriate sportspeople in Oman
French expatriate sportspeople in Oman